Charles Philip Newkey Burden (born June 1973) is a British journalist and author. He has written 29 books, including one co-written with Julie Burchill. Three of the books have been official publications for Arsenal F.C.

Newkey-Burden began his career as a staff writer on 90 Minutes and Shoot. He was chief sub editor on The Big Issue. He has been a contributing editor to Loaded and a columnist for Time Out, Attitude and The Jewish Chronicle. He has interviewed David Beckham, Ricky Gervais, Steve Coogan, Frank Lampard, Alan Shearer
, Rachel Stevens
 and McFly for magazine cover features.

In June 2005, Prince Charles complained to The Big Issue about an article Newkey-Burden had written comparing Prince William to an antelope. Newkey-Burden was also criticised in December 2011 for updating his 2008 biography of Amy Winehouse only a few weeks after her death. To deflect criticism, some of his books are written by "Charlie Burden". In July 2008, Private Eye reported that he had submitted five comically positive reviews of his own books to the Amazon website. Burden's boyfriend is Chris Morris, an NLP practitioner (?) 

He is a Celtic F.C. fan.

Bibliography

Arsenal FC
 The Official Arsenal Annual, 2005 - 2012
 Gunners Lists, Hamlyn, 2009 - 
 The All-New Official Arsenal Miscellany, Hamlyn, 2007 -

Celebrity biographies
 Adele: The Biography, John Blake, 2011 - 
 Tom Daley: The Unauthorized Biography, Michael O'Mara, 2011 - 	
 Justin Bieber: The Unauthorized Biography, Michael O'Mara, 2010 - 
 Brad & Angelina, Penguin, 2010 - 
 Dannii Minogue, John Blake, 2010 - 
 The Wanted, Michael O'Mara, 2010 - 
 Simon Cowell: The Unauthorized Biography, Michael O'Mara, 2009 - 
 Michael Jackson: Legend, Michael O'Mara, 2009 - 
 Alexandra Burke: A Star is Born, Metro, 2009 - 
 Heston Blumenthal: The Biography of the World's Most Brilliant Master Chef, John Blake, 2009 – 
 Stephenie Meyer: Queen of Twilight, John Blake, 2009 - 
 Amy Winehouse: The Biography, John Blake, 2008 - 
 Paris Hilton: Life On The Edge, John Blake, 2007 -

Humour
 Help! I'm Turning Into My Dad!, Prion, 2008 – 
 Great Email Disasters, Metro, 2007 - 
 The Reduced History of Dogs, Andre Deutsch, 2007 - 
 The Reduced History of Britain, Andre Deutsch, 2006 -

Misc
 The Dog Directory, Hamlyn, 2009 – 
 Not In My Name: A Compendium of Modern Hypocrisy, Virgin Books, 2008 (co-written with Julie Burchill) - 
 Crap Towns and Crap Towns II (contributor)
 Loaded's Greatest Ever Englishmen (contributor)

References

External links 

Chas Newkey-Burden at The Guardian

British male journalists
Living people
British gay writers
English LGBT writers
1973 births
21st-century LGBT people